Ferrycarrig Park has been the home of League of Ireland side Wexford Football Club since joining the league in 2007. The building works for the new stadium and facilities, at Newcastle, Crossabeg, have been ongoing since 2003. Currently spectator facilities consist of a clubhouse with viewing area and a 609 seater temporary stand. The plans for a permanent stand to seat over 2,000 people are in place. Building work is in progress on a fully equipped gym on the site.

An application for retention of developments at the Wexford football complex was rejected by Wexford Planners in October 2007. This decision threatens the future development of the club and has slowed work on the complex considerably. The decision is in the appeals process at present.

Access to the stadium is signposted from the N11. The signs along the roadside are small and care should be taken when approaching the junctions along the N11. The roads leading to the entrance to the ground are narrow and winding and caution is required. There is no direct access from the N11.

Stadium information
The single temporary stand fully covers 609 seats and holds both home and away supporters. This stand replaced another un-covered temporary stand, on the opposite (south) side of the ground, from the start of the 2008 season. There are no stands in place behind the goals though there is limited standing space at both ends of the ground.  The refreshment stall and supporters club are both found in the north-west corner.

Extra temporary seating was put in place when Wexford hosted the 2008 League Cup Final.  Extra stands were put in place on all four sides of the ground.

The large complex in the south-west corner holds the dressing rooms, and also a wine-bar and restaurant.

Notable matches
Ferrycarrig Park hosted the 2008 League Cup final after Wexford Youths won a toss for home advantage in the decider against Derry City FC. A number of alterations to the current set up were made to accommodate live television coverage and a large crowd.

Ferrycarrig Park hosted an Irish UEFA Women's Championship qualifier against Russia, on 21 August 2010.

See also
 Stadiums of Ireland

References

Association football venues in the Republic of Ireland
Sports venues in County Wexford
Wexford F.C.
Wexford Youths W.F.C.